La Run is a Canadian crime drama film, directed by Demian Fuica and released in 2011. The film stars Jason Roy Léveillée as Guillaume, an academically gifted university student who agrees to participate in drug smuggling to help his father (Paul Dion) pay off gambling debts.

The cast also includes Marc Beaupré as Guillaume's best friend Manu, Nicolas Canuel as drug boss Rivière and Pierre-Luc Brillant as rival smuggler Boutch, as well as Martin Dubreuil and Nanette Workman in supporting roles.

The film was originally slated to be released theatrically in April 2011, but was delayed and ultimately premiered at the Montreal World Film Festival in August.

The film received three Jutra Award nominations at the 14th Jutra Awards in 2012, for Best Supporting Actor (Canuel), Best Screenplay (Demian Fuica, Léonardo Fuica and Martin Poirier), and Best Editing (Demian Fuica).

References

External links

2011 films
Canadian crime drama films
Films shot in Quebec
Films set in Quebec
Quebec films
French-language Canadian films
2010s Canadian films